Volta Redonda Futebol Clube, commonly referred to as Voltaço, is a Brazilian professional club based in Volta Redonda, Rio de Janeiro founded on 9 February 1976. It competes in the Campeonato Brasileiro Série C, the third tier of Brazilian football, as well as in the Campeonato Carioca, the top tier of the Rio de Janeiro state football league.

History

Foundation
In 1975, the only professional team of the city of Volta Redonda was Clube de Regatas do Flamengo of Volta Redonda (not be confused with Clube de Regatas do Flamengo of Rio de Janeiro city), commonly known as Flamenguinho. In the same year, the states of Rio de Janeiro and Guanabara fused. Because of the fusion of the two states, the Federação Carioca de Futebol ("Carioca Football Federation", Rio de Janeiro city football federation) and Federação Fluminense de Desportos ("Fluminense Sporting Federation", federation of the interior cities of today's Rio de Janeiro state) also fused.

At a meeting between the president of Companhia Siderúrgica Nacional (CSN), Volta Redonda city mayor Nelson Gonçalves, Doctor Guanayr and Admiral Heleno Nunes (president of CBD, Confederação Brasileira de Desportos, "Brazilian Sporting Confederation"), Doctor Guanayr defended the idea that Flamenguinho should represent the city in Campeonato Carioca, but Admiral Heleno Nunes decided that the new team should be named Volta Redonda Futebol Clube and the team colors should be the same colors of Volta Redonda Municipality: black, yellow and white.

On February 9, 1976, Volta Redonda Futebol Clube was founded at the meeting room of the Federação Carioca de Futebol, with the presence of the board of directors of Clube de Regatas Flamengo of Volta Redonda, of Associação Atlética Comercial and representatives of the City Hall of the city of Volta Redonda.

2005 Campeonato Carioca
Volta Redonda, newly promoted to the first division of Campeonato Carioca surprised the football fans and the press, and won the traditional and prestigious Taça Guanabara (the first turn of Campeonato Carioca), after defeating strong teams such as Vasco da Gama. This title qualified the team to play in the finals of Campeonato Carioca. Fluminense won Taça Rio (the second turn of Campeonato Carioca). The Campeonato Carioca final between Volta Redonda and Fluminense was played in two matches, both at Maracanã stadium. In the first match, Volta Redonda beat Fluminense by 4–3, needing only a draw in the second match to win the competition. However, the second match ended 3–1 to Fluminense. Volta Redonda finished the competition as runner-up of Campeonato Carioca.

2006 Copa do Brasil
In 2006, Volta Redonda reached the quarterfinals of Copa do Brasil. In the first stage, the club beat América Mineiro. In the second stage, Volta Redonda defeated first division club Atlético Paranaense. In the third stage, 15 de Novembro of Campo Bom was beaten by Volta Redonda. On May 4, at Estádio São Januário, Volta Redonda was defeated by Vasco da Gama 2–1 and eliminated of the competition. In the first leg, played on April 27,  Volta Redonda and Vasco drew 0–0.

2016 Campeonato Brasileiro Série D

In 2016, Volta Redonda rose with one of the most impressive campaigns in the Série D, beating Fluminense de Feira twice, thus gaining access to the 2017 Série C. In the finals, they beat CSA 4–0.

Stadium

Volta Redonda's stadium is the Estádio Raulino de Oliveira. The stadium has a maximum capacity of 20,255 people.

Rivalries

Volta Redonda's biggest rival is Barra Mansa, with whom he plays the Clássico do Sul Fluminense (Rio de Janeiro's South derby).

Players

Current squad

Out on loan

Honours
 Campeonato Brasileiro Série D
 Winners (1): 2016

 Copa Rio
 Winners (5): 1994, 1995, 1999, 2007, 2022

 Campeonato Carioca Série A2
 Winners (4): 1987, 1990, 2004, 2022

References

External links
 Official Site
 Volta Redonda on Globo Esporte

Volta Redonda Futebol Clube
Association football clubs established in 1976
Football clubs in Rio de Janeiro (state)
Football clubs in Brazil
1976 establishments in Brazil
Campeonato Brasileiro Série D winners